Mount Bowlin is a mountain,  high, standing between the mouths of Van Reeth Glacier and Robison Glacier in the Queen Maud Mountains. It was discovered in December 1934 by the Byrd Antarctic Expedition geological party under Quin Blackburn, and named by Richard E. Byrd for William H. Bowlin, airplane pilot with the expedition.

References
 

Mountains of Marie Byrd Land